Live at the Sugar Club is the name of a DVD and CD set released by singer/songwriter Sinéad O'Connor in 2008. The set features a live concert performance by O'Connor from November 8, 2006 at The Sugar Club in Dublin, Ireland. It was sold exclusively on her website in a limited number of two thousand copies.

Track listing

Personnel
Sinéad O'Connor - vocals, guitar
Steve Cooney - guitar
Vinnie Kilduff - mandolin, low whistle
Laoise Kelly - harp
Odhrán O'Casaide - violin

Produced by O'Connor.

Extra material
An Introduction to Theology - Interview with Sinéad O'Connor

References

Sinéad O'Connor albums
2008 live albums
2008 video albums
Live video albums
2000s English-language films